Tin iodide may refer to two different ionic compounds.
 Tin(II) iodide or stannous iodide
 Tin(IV) iodide or stannic iodide